X: The Unheard Music is a 1986 rockumentary film directed by W.T. Morgan about the Los Angeles punk band X.
The film stars John Doe, Exene Cervenka, Billy Zoom, and D.J. Bonebrake.

X: The Unheard Music was filmed by Angel City Productions between 1980 and 1985 in around Los Angeles. Post-production was completed almost five years to the month after shooting began.

The film was released on DVD and Blu-ray through MVD on December 7, 2011. Special features include footage of John Doe and Exene Cervenka in discussion as well as an interview with Angel City, the company behind the film. A live outtake and a trailer for the feature are also included on the disc.

Songs in order of performance
"Los Angeles"
"Year One"
"We're Desperate"
"Because I Do"
"Beyond & Back"
"Come Back to Me"
"Soul Kitchen"
"White Girl"
"The Once Over Twice"
"Motel Room in My Bed"
"The Unheard Music"
"Real Child of Hell"
"Johnny Hit & Run Paulene"
"I Must Not Think Bad Thoughts"
"The World's a Mess; It's in My Kiss"
"The Have Nots"

References

External links
Band's website

1986 films
1986 documentary films
Documentary films about punk music and musicians
Films shot in Los Angeles
X (American band)
1980s English-language films